Nicholas is a male given name and a surname.

Nicholas may also refer to:

 Nicholas (telenovela), a 1958 Brazilian telenovela
 Nicholas (album), an album by Nicholas Teo 
 Nicholas (novel), a 1924 children's fantasy novel by Anne Carroll Moore
 Nicholas (duo), American gospel music husband and wife duo
 Mount Nicholas
 Nicholas, United States Virgin Islands
 Nicholas, Virginia
 Cyclone Nicholas

See also

 Nicholas County (disambiguation)
 Saint Nicholas (disambiguation)
 
 Nicola (disambiguation)
 Nicole (disambiguation)
 Nikola (disambiguation)
 Nikolai (disambiguation)
 Nick (disambiguation)